Uvis Kalniņš (born October 24, 1993 in Valmiera) is a Latvian swimmer, who specialized in sprint freestyle events. He won a bronze medal in the men's 100 m freestyle at the 2011 European Junior Swimming Championships in Belgrade, Serbia, with a time of 50.18 seconds. Kalniņš is also a member of the swimming team for the Missouri State Bears, and an undergraduate student at Missouri State University in Springfield, Missouri.

Kalniņš qualified for the men's 100 m freestyle, as a member of the Latvian swimming team, at the 2012 Summer Olympics in London, by eclipsing a FINA B-standard time of 50.18 seconds from the European Junior Championships. He challenged seven other swimmers on the fourth heat, including British-born Paraguayan swimmer Benjamin Hockin. Kalniņš raced to second place, and dipped under a 50-second barrier by a quarter of a second (0.25) behind Turkey's Kemal Arda Gürdal, in his personal best of 49.96. Kalniņš failed to advance into the semifinals, as he placed thirtieth overall in the preliminaries.

At the 2013 World Aquatics Championships in Barcelona, Kalniņš competed in the 100 and 200 m freestyle but failed to advance past the heats, finishing with times of 50.51 and 1:51.91 respectively.

Career best times

Long course (50-meter pool)

References

External links
 Profile – Missouri State Bears
NBC Olympics Profile

1993 births
Living people
Latvian male freestyle swimmers
Olympic swimmers of Latvia
Swimmers at the 2012 Summer Olympics
Swimmers at the 2016 Summer Olympics
People from Valmiera
Missouri State Bears swimmers
Competitors at the 2015 Summer Universiade